Simran is an Indian actress who has starred in several Indian films. who has predominantly appeared in Tamil, Telugu and a few Malayalam films. She debuted in Bollywood and acted in Hindi films, before starring in her first Tamil film V.I.P and her first Telugu film Abbai Gari Pelli in 1997. Having a string of successes in her early career, in 1999, Simran received critical praise for playing a blind woman in Thulladha Manamum Thullum. However the turning point of her career came with the success of Vaali (1999) which made Simran the most successful actress in the industry. At the peak of her career she agreed to play the role of an antagonist in Parthen Rasithen (2000) and in Priyamaanavale (2000) as a woman living in agony caused by a premarital agreement. Both went on to become commercial and critical successes. She received her first Filmfare Award for Best Tamil Actress for Kannathil Muthamittal (2002), as the mother of an adopted 9-year-old daughter. Other than romantic dramas, Simran had also appeared in two blockbuster comedy films alongside Kamal Haasan; Pammal K. Sambandam and Panchathantiram, both released in 2002. In Telugu, Simran starred in a series of commercially successful films, Samarasimha Reddy (1999), Kalisundam Raa (2000) and Narasimha Naidu (2001). With the success of the 2004 sci fi film New, Simran left the film industry following her marriage with her childhood family friend Deepak Bagga. In 2008 she made a comeback to Tamil cinema with Vaaranam Aayiram, where she played the role of a mother and a wife to the characters played by Suriya and won the Filmfare Award for Best Supporting Actress.

Behindwoods Gold Medals Awards

JFW Movie Awards
A night of celebrating the stalwart women artists from on and behind the screen.

Cinema Express Awards
The Cinema Express Awards are presented annually by Indian Express Group to honour artistic excellence of professionals in the south Indian film industry which comprises Tamil, Telugu, Kannada and Malayalam film industries.

Dinakaran Film Awards
The Dinakaran Cinema Awards are presented to the best artistes and technicians of Tamil Cinema (of the respective year), on behalf of Dinakaran Tamil daily newspaper. Readers of Dinakaran paper choose these award winners.

Film Fans Association Awards

Filmfare Awards South
The Filmfare Awards South is the South Indian segment of the annual Filmfare Awards, presented by The Times Group to honour both artistic and technical excellence of professionals in the South Indian film industry. The awards are separately given  for Kannada, Tamil, Telugu and Malayalam films.

International Tamil Film Awards
The International Tamil Film Awards (ITFA) is an awards ceremony that honours excellence in Tamil language films around the world since 2003.

Kalaimamani Awards
The Kalaimamani is an award in Tamil Nadu state, India. These awards are given by the Tamil Nadu Iyal Isai Nataka Manram (literature, music and theatre) for excellence in the field of art and literature.

Tamil Nadu State Film Awards
The Tamil Nadu State Film Awards are the most notable film awards given for Tamil films in India. They are given annually to honour the best talents and provide encouragement and incentive to the South Indian film industry by the Government of Tamil Nadu.

Vijay Awards
The Vijay Awards are presented by the Tamil television channel STAR Vijay to honour excellence in Tamil cinema.

See also
 Simran
 Simran filmography

References

Simran